Story: 10th Anniversary is a best of/compilation by Finnish heavy metal band Amorphis. It was released in 2000 to commemorate the band's tenth anniversary.

Track listing

Credits

Amorphis
Pasi Koskinen – vocals (2, 3, 6-9, 11, 12)
Esa Holopainen – lead guitar, music (2)
Tomi Koivusaari –  rhythm guitar, vocals (1, 2, 4, 5, 10, 11, 13, & 14)
Santeri Kallio – keyboards (3, 7 & 12)
Pekka Kasari – drums  (2, 3, 6-9, 11 & 12)

Additional musicians
Olli-Pekka Laine – bass guitar
Jan Rechberger – drums (1, 4, 5, 10, 13, & 14); keyboards (4, 10 & 13)

Keyboardists
Kasper Mårtenson (1, 5, & 14), music (1,)
Kim Rantala (2, 6, 8, 9 & 11)

References

Amorphis albums
2000 compilation albums
Relapse Records compilation albums
Death metal compilation albums